General elections were held in India between 19 and 25 February 1962 to elect members of the 3rd Lok Sabha. Unlike the previous two elections, each constituency elected a single member.

Jawaharlal Nehru won another landslide victory in his third and final election campaign. The Indian National Congress received 44.7% of the vote and won 361 of the 494 elected seats. This was only slightly lower than in the previous two elections and they still held over 70% of the seats in the Lok Sabha.

Results

By-elections 
In 1963, a by-election was held for the Bilaspur Lok Sabha seat, which was at the time in Madhya Pradesh. The election was won by the Indian National Congress candidate C. Singh, with  votes, against  M. L. Shukla of Jana Sangh with  votes. This by-election was needed because the original election for this seat was declared void by the Madhya Pradesh High Court, which judged that the nomination papers of one of the candidates, Bashir Ahmed Qureshi, "was improperly and illegally rejected by the Returning Officer".

See also
Election Commission of India
1962 Indian presidential election

References

General election
General elections in India
February 1962 events in Asia
India